Kamara Ghedi (born February 19, 1976), known by his stage name Kamara, is a Romanian singer.

Life

Born in Bucharest, Romania to a French Guinean father, Kamara is the member of the pop group Alb Negru. He is also of Greek descent . His grandfather was a Minister in French Guinea.

Career

With Todomondo, he and Andrei Ștefănescu (Alb Negru band) represented Romania in the Eurovision Song Contest 2007 and placed 13th with the song "Liubi, Liubi, I Love You".

He played soccer in college for Universitatea Cluj-Napoca.

References

External links
 Alb Negru at Media Pro Music

1976 births
21st-century Romanian male singers
21st-century Romanian singers
Romanian male pop singers
Romanian people of Guinean descent
Living people
Musicians from Bucharest